Mortonsville is an unincorporated community in Woodford County, in the U.S. state of Kentucky.

History
A post office was established at Mortonsville in 1828, and remained in operation until 1921. The community was named for its founder, Jeremiah Morton.

References

Unincorporated communities in Woodford County, Kentucky
Unincorporated communities in Kentucky